Mustapha Lachaal (born 10 February 1964) is a retired Moroccan runner who saw success on continental level.

He won two medals, silver in 800 and bronze in 1500 metres, at the inaugural 1984 Arab Junior Championships. In the 1500 metres he then finished eighth at the 1987 Mediterranean Games, won the bronze medals at the 1988 African Championships and 1989 Jeux de la Francophonie, and the gold medal at the 1989 Arab Championships. He became Moroccan champion in the 800 metres in 1985, and in the 1500 metres in 1985, 1986 and 1987.

His personal best times were 3:35.78 minutes in the 1500 metres, achieved in July 1988 in Verona; 7:53.01 minutes in the 3000 metres, achieved in June 1990 in Reims; and 13:48.59 minutes in the 5000 metres, achieved in April 1991 in Palermo.

References

1964 births
Living people
Moroccan male middle-distance runners
Athletes (track and field) at the 1987 Mediterranean Games
Mediterranean Games competitors for Morocco